Faseel-e-Jaan Se Aagay (meaning: Beyond the Call of Duty) is an action series directed by Brig Syed Mujtaba Tirmizi and Azeem Sajjad on behalf of the Pakistani armed forces for the state television broadcaster PTV. The executive producer of the drama serial is Khawar Azhar, whereas the writer is Asghar Nadeem Syed. This project was made by Inter Services Public Relations - ISPR in cooperation with CRS. Season 2 of the drama series was released on June 10, 2011.

Plot 
The series is about 22 Pakistani soldiers who fought the Tehrik-i-Taliban Pakistan in the tribal areas under federal administration in the Afghan-Pakistani border area . The plot is set in 2009. All of the episodes are based on true events.

Cast
 Saba Qamar as Neelofar

Production 
Two seasons have been produced so far (as of September 2011).

Each episode costed about $12,000. The main characters are played by soldiers of the Pakistani Armed Forces who do not receive any extra payments. Real war equipment was used.

References

Pakistani drama films
Pakistani drama television series